2000–01 NEBL was the second complete season of the North European Basketball League. The tournament was held during the 2000–01 basketball season on 30 November 2000 – 22 April 2001.

The winner of the NEBL championship was awarded with $45,000 cheque, the other finalist received $25,000, 3rd-place winner - $20,000 and 4th best team got $10,000.

Ural Great won the tournament by defeating Žalgiris in the final.

Sergei Chikalkin from Ural Great was named as the Most valuable player.

Clubs

Regular season

Results 

Source: Worldbasket.com

Play-offs

Eight-finals

Quarterfinals

Final Four

Semifinal 1

Semifinal 2

Third-place game

Final

Final standings

NEBL Challenge Cup'2001
Challenge Cup was second-tier competition for clubs, that wanted to be promoted to first-tier NEBL tournament (Championship). Four NEBL Championship worst teams transferred to NEBL Challenge Cup'2001 Second stage.

Clubs

First stage

Group A
All games played in Batumi from 16 to 18 February 2001.

Group B
All games played in Bergen from 17 to 19 February 2001.

Group C
All games played in Odessa from 21 to 23 February 2001.

Ranking of fourth-placed teams

Second stage

Group D
All games played in Södertälje from 19 to 20 March 2001.

Semifinals

Third-place game

Final

Group E
All games played in Grodno from 26 to 27 March 2001.

Semifinals

Third-place game

Final

Group F
All games played in Tartu from 14 to 15 March 2001.

Semifinals

Third-place game

Final

Group G
All games played in Birmingham from 20 to 21 March 2001.

Semifinals

Third-place game

Final

Final Four
Final Four was held in Odessa from 27 to 28 April 2001.
Spartak withdraw. It was replaced with Grodno-93 by NEBL decision.
Yorick Williams (Pertemps Bullets) was named the MVP of the Final Four.

Semifinals

Third-place game

Final

Final standings

References

External links
 Teams
 Schedule
 Scores
 Challenge Cup. Schedule

2000
2000–01 in European basketball leagues
2000–01 in Lithuanian basketball
2000–01 in Latvian basketball
2000–01 in Swedish basketball
2000–01 in Estonian basketball
2000–01 in Finnish basketball
2000 in Danish sport
2001 in Danish sport
2000–01 in German basketball
2000–01 in Russian basketball
2000–01 in Ukrainian basketball
2000–01 in Czech basketball
2000 in English sport
2001 in English sport
2000–01 in Dutch basketball
2000–01 in Polish basketball
2001 in Norwegian sport
2000–01 in Belarusian basketball
2000–01 in Georgian basketball